Wilburtha is a section of Ewing Township in Mercer County, New Jersey, United States. Located where Wilburtha Road crosses the Delaware and Raritan Canal, it is one of the oldest settlements in Ewing Township and developed due to the construction of the canal in the early 19th century. The community was known as Greensburg before adopting its current name in 1883. The Yardley–Wilburtha Bridge once connected Wilburtha to Yardley, Pennsylvania on the other side of the Delaware River. The Belvidere Delaware Railroad once passed through the village.  Today, Wilburtha is primarily a residential neighborhood consisting of detached, single-family homes, the majority of which were built in the 1950s through the early 1980s. There are still many Georgian and Federal-style homes found in the area.

References

Neighborhoods in Ewing Township, New Jersey
Unincorporated communities in Mercer County, New Jersey
Unincorporated communities in New Jersey